Visitors to Albania must obtain a visa from one of the Albanian diplomatic missions unless they come from one of the visa exempt countries or are qualified for visa-free entry.

Entering with a passport is required. Citizens from certain countries or territories, however, are eligible for visa-free travel with only their ID cards in lieu of their passports. Passports must be valid for at least 3 months from the date of arrival.

The visa policy of Albania is based on the by Law Nr. 108/2013 “On foreign citizens”, amended and the Decision of the Council of Ministers Nr. 513/2013 “On criteria and procedures for entry, stay and treatment of foreign citizens”, amended.

The visa policy of Albania is similar to the visa policy of the Schengen Area. It grants 90-day visa-free entry to all Schengen Annex II nationalities, except for Dominica, East Timor, Grenada, Kiribati, Marshall Islands, Micronesia, Palau, Saint Lucia, Saint Vincent and the Grenadines, Samoa, Solomon Islands, Tonga, Tuvalu and Vanuatu. It also grants visa-free entry to several additional countries – Armenia, Azerbaijan, China, Kazakhstan, Kosovo, Kuwait and Turkey.

Visa policy map

Visa-free access
Holders of passports (or in certain cases ID cards) of the following 88 jurisdictions can enter Albania without a visa for a maximum stay of 90 days (unless otherwise noted):

1 - may enter using a national ID card or Irish passport card.
2 - allowed to stay for 30 days without a visa. 
3 - citizens of these countries or territories staying for more than 90 days within 180 days are required to obtain a type "D" visa.
4 - countries whose citizens can enter without visas due to the "visa liberalization
with the Schengen area".
5 - allowed to stay for 1 year without a visa.

Substitute visas
Any visitor who holds a valid, multiple-entry and previously used visa or a residence permit issued by a Schengen area country, United States, or the United Kingdom can enter Albania without a visa for 90 days. Visa must have been used at least once before arrival to Albania. The visa exemption also applies to valid Green Card holders, holders of resident permits issued by a Schengen country, or holders of refugee and stateless travel documents issued by an EU or EFTA member state. (And there are some more visa exemptions.)

Visitors of Albanian ethnicity do not require a visa to enter Albania for a maximum stay of 90 days within 180 days.

Recent and future changes

Non-ordinary passports
Additionally, holders of diplomatic or service passports from Algeria, Cuba, Ecuador, Egypt, India, Indonesia, Jordan, Mongolia, Morocco, Oman, Philippines, Russia, South Africa, Saudi Arabia, Thailand and Vietnam and holders of diplomatic passports of Tunisia do not require a visa to visit Albania.

Reciprocity

Albanian citizens can enter without a visa some of the countries whose citizens are granted visa-free access to Albania but require a visa for Argentina, Australia, Azerbaijan, Bahamas, Brunei, Canada, China, Costa Rica, Guatemala, Honduras, Ireland, Japan, Kazakhstan, Kuwait, Mauritius (grants visa on arrival), Mexico, New Zealand, Nicaragua, Panama, Paraguay, Peru, Taiwan, United Arab Emirates, United Kingdom, United States, and Venezuela.

Visa application 
Citizens of the countries requiring visas should apply at the following diplomatic missions of Albania (citizens of countries without an assigned embassy should contact the geographically nearest diplomatic mission):

Abu Dhabi: Oman, Yemen
Ankara: Afghanistan, Georgia, Iran, Iraq, Kyrgyzstan, Tajikistan, Turkmenistan
Beijing: Bangladesh, Cambodia, China, India, Indonesia, Mongolia, Nepal, North Korea, Philippines, Sri Lanka, Thailand, Vietnam
Brasilia: Bolivia, Colombia, Cuba, Dominican Republic, Ecuador, Guyana, Haiti, Peru, Suriname
Bucharest: Liberia, Morocco, Palestine
Cairo: Cameroon, Congo, Egypt, Eritrea, Ethiopia, Gabon, Ghana, Guinea, Jordan, Kenya, Lebanon, Lesotho, Libya, Madagascar, Malawi, Mauritania, Mozambique, Namibia, Nigeria, Pakistan, Palestine, Rwanda, Senegal, Sierra Leone, Somalia, Sudan, Syria, Tanzania, Togo, Tunisia, Uganda, Zambia, Zimbabwe
Doha: Bahrain, Qatar
Istanbul: Afghanistan, Congo, Georgia, Guinea, Iran, Iraq, Lebanon, Lesotho, Libya, Madagascar, Malawi, Mauritania, Mozambique, Namibia, Nigeria, Pakistan, Rwanda, Senegal, Sierra Leone, Syria, Tanzania, Togo, Tunisia, Turkmenistan, Uganda, Uzbekistan, Zambia, Zimbabwe
London: Belize, Fiji, Ivory Coast, Jamaica, Maldives, São Tomé and Príncipe, South Africa, Trinidad and Tobago
Madrid: Gibraltar, Peru
Moscow: Belarus, Kyrgyzstan, Mongolia, Russia, Tajikistan, Turkmenistan, Uzbekistan
New York City: Dominican Republic, Haiti, Jamaica 
Paris: Algeria, Benin, Botswana, Morocco, Senegal
Riyadh: Bahrain, Oman, Saudi Arabia, Somalia, Yemen
Rome: Angola, Burkina Faso, Gabon, Ghana, Guyana, Mali, South Africa
Sofia: Cuba, North Korea
Tokyo: Fiji
Warsaw: Belarus

See also
Visa requirements for Albanian citizens
Visa policy of the Schengen Area

References

External links

Albanian Ministry of Foreign Affairs

Foreign relations of Albania
Albania